Schizophrenia disorder 10 (periodic catatonia) is a protein that in humans is encoded by the SCZD10 gene.

References